Brian Rogers (born February 15, 1984) is an American mixed martial artist currently competing in the Light Heavyweight division. A professional competitor since 2008, Rogers has formerly competed for Bellator and Strikeforce.

Background
Rogers was born and grew up in Kent, Ohio. He attended Theodore Roosevelt High School where he wrestled, played football and threw the shot disc. After high school, he was a four-year letter winner and a three-year starter as inside linebacker for the Walsh University Cavaliers between 2002 and 2005. Rogers was named All-Conference by the Mid States Football Association twice and left Walsh University second all time in career tackles. Rogers graduated with undergraduate degree in education and started training mixed martial arts in 2006. He later graduated with master's degree in education from University of Akron.

Mixed martial arts career

Early career
Rogers started his professional MMA career at 1–2 with both losses coming by decision. He followed the slow start to his professional MMA career with 7 consecutive victories, all by first round KO/TKO which included wins in both his Strikeforce and Bellator debuts.

Strikeforce
Rogers made his Strikeforce debut on March 5, 2011 at Strikeforce: Feijao vs. Henderson where he defeated Ian Rammel by TKO in the first round.

Bellator MMA
On May 21, 2011 it was announced that Rogers will be taking part in the Bellator Season Five Middleweight Tournament which begins on September 17, 2011.  Rogers defeated Victor O'Donnell via TKO in the quarterfinal round at Bellator 50.  In the semifinal round, Rogers lost to Alexander Shlemenko via TKO in the second round at Bellator 54.

On January 9, 2012 Rogers was announced as the first of eight participants in Bellator's Season 6 Middleweight Tournament. In the opening round, he faced Vitor Vianna on March 16, 2012 at Bellator 61 and won via KO in the first round. The knockout received incredible media and fan attention and has since had over 400,000 views on YouTube as one of Bellator's most popular videos in the promotion's short history.

Rogers was scheduled to face Bruno Santos in the semifinal round of the Middleweight Tournament at Bellator 66.  However, on April 16, 2012, it was revealed that Santos had to withdraw due to a shoulder injury and was replaced by Bellator newcomer Andreas Spang. After dominating most of the first two rounds, he was caught by a counter left hook which resulted in a KO loss.

In January 2013, Bellator announced Rogers as a competitor in the Season Eight Middleweight tournament. His Quarterfinal fight took place at Bellator 89 against Dan Cramer. He lost the fight via unanimous decision.

Rogers then participated in Bellator's Season Nine Middleweight tournament. The Quarterfinal bout took place on September 7, 2013 at Bellator 98 against Mikkel Parlo. Rogers lost via unanimous decision.

Rogers was scheduled to face Gary Tapusoa on March 21, 2014 at Bellator 113, however, the bout was cancelled when Tapusoa could not meet the requirements to fight. Rogers was set to face Johan Romming at Bellator 119 on May 9, 2014, however, the bout was cancelled when Romming pulled out due to undisclosed reasons. Rogers faced Adrian Miles at Bellator 119 and won via flying knee KO in the second round.

Rogers was expected to face James Irvin on September 19, 2014 at Bellator 125. However, Irvin pulled out of the bout due to injury and was replaced with Brett Cooper. Cooper then suffered a foot injury and pulled out of the bout, so Rogers faced promotional newcomer Rafael Carvalho. He lost the fight via TKO in the first round.

Rogers faced Joey Beltran at Bellator 136 on April 10, 2015. He lost the fight by split decision.

Rogers next moved to the Light Heavyweight division and faced Virgil Zwicker on December 4, 2015 at Bellator 147. He won the fight via submission in the second round.

Rogers faced UFC vet Alessio Sakara at Bellators first event in Italy on April 16, 2016 at Bellator 152. He lost via knockout in the second round.

Personal life
Rogers spent the majority of his mma career training in Independence Ohio at Strong Style MMA. Strong Style MMA is home to the current UFC Heavyweight Champion Stipe Miocic. Other Strong Style UFC Veteran's  include Jessica Eye, Forrest Petz, Jeff Cox and Dan Bobish.

Rogers , an Ohio Native moved from his home state to Denver Colorado in January 2014 to further his mma career. Rogers has not competed since March 2017. Rogers is now a business development and marketing professional.

Mixed martial arts record

|-
|Win
|align=center|14–9
|Canaan Grigsby	
|Decision (unanimous)
|Paramount MMA 7
|
|align=center|3
|align=center|5:00
|Denver, Colorado, United States
|
|-
|Win
|align=center|13–9
|Lewis Rumsey	
|TKO (punch)
|RFO Big Guns 22
|
|align=center|1
|align=center|1:00
|Mansfield, Ohio, United States
|Catchweight bout of 220 lbs.
|-
| Loss
| align=center| 12–9 
| Alessio Sakara
| KO (punches)
| Bellator 152
| 
| align=center| 2
| align=center| 2:29
| Torino, Italy
|
|-
|Win
|align=center|12–8
|Virgil Zwicker
|Submission (arm-triangle choke)
|Bellator 147
|
|align=center|2
|align=center|4:38
|San Jose, California, United States
|Light Heavyweight debut.
|-
|Loss
|align=center|11–8
|Joey Beltran
|Decision (majority)
|Bellator 136
|
|align=center|3
|align=center|5:00
|Irvine, California, United States
|
|-
| Loss
|align=center| 11–7
| Rafael Carvalho
| TKO (punches)
| Bellator 125
| 
|align=center|1
|align=center|3:06
|Fresno, California, United States
|
|-
| Win
|align=center| 11–6
| Adrian Miles
| KO (flying knee)
| Bellator 119
| 
|align=center|2
|align=center|1:29
|Rama, Ontario, Canada
|
|-
|Loss
|align=center|10–6
|Mikkel Parlo
|Decision (unanimous)
|Bellator 98
|
|align=center|3
|align=center|5:00
|Uncasville, Connecticut, United States
|
|-
|Loss
|align=center|10–5
|Dan Cramer
|Decision (unanimous)
|Bellator 89
|
|align=center|3
|align=center|5:00
|Charlotte, North Carolina, United States
|
|-
| Win
|align=center| 10–4
| Dominique Steele
| Decision (unanimous)
| Bellator 78
| 
|align=center|3
|align=center|5:00
|Dayton, Ohio, United States
|
|-
| Loss
|align=center| 9–4
| Andreas Spang
| KO (punch)
| Bellator 66
| 
|align=center|2
|align=center|3:34
|Cleveland, Ohio, United States
|
|-
| Win
|align=center| 9–3
| Vitor Vianna
| KO (flying knee)
| Bellator 61
| 
|align=center|1
|align=center|4:14
|Bossier City, Louisiana, United States
|
|-
| Loss
|align=center| 8–3
| Alexander Shlemenko
| TKO (knees)
| Bellator 54 
| 
|align=center|2
|align=center|2:30
|Atlantic City, New Jersey, United States
|
|-
| Win
|align=center| 8–2
| Victor O'Donnell
| TKO (head kick and punches)
| Bellator 50 
| 
|align=center|1 
|align=center|1:56 
|Hollywood, Florida, United States
|
|-
| Win
|align=center| 7–2
| Ian Rammel
| TKO (punches)
| Strikeforce: Feijao vs. Henderson 
| 
|align=center| 1
|align=center| 4:23
|Columbus, Ohio, United States
| 
|-
| Win
|align=center| 6–2
| Robert Conner
| TKO (flying knee and punches)
| BUCB: Pride and Glory  
| 
|align=center| 1
|align=center| 3:07
|Parma, Ohio, United States
| 
|-
| Win
|align=center| 5–2
| Marcus Reynolds
| TKO (punches)
| BUCB: Raging Bull 
| 
|align=center| 1
|align=center| 1:32
|Parma, Ohio, United States
|  
|-
| Win
|align=center| 4–2
| Jason Jones
| TKO (kick to the body and punch)
| NAAFS: Fight Night in the Flats 6 
| 
|align=center| 1
|align=center| 0:52
|Cleveland, Ohio, United States
| 
|-
| Win
|align=center| 3–2
| Neal Craft
| TKO (punches)
| NAAFS: Caged Fury 10 
| 
|align=center| 1
|align=center| 2:21
|Uhrichsville, Ohio, United States
| 
|-
| Win
|align=center| 2–2
| Dan Bolden
| KO (flying knee)
| NAAFS: North Coast Showdown 4
| 
|align=center| 1
|align=center| 1:14
|Toledo, Ohio, United States
| 
|-
| Loss
|align=center| 1–2
| Valter Roberto De Menezes
| Decision (unanimous)
| Shine Fights 1: Genesis 
| 
|align=center| 3
|align=center| 5:00
|Columbus, Ohio, United States
| 
|-
| Win
|align=center| 1–1
| Willie Smalls
| Submission (triangle choke)
| NAAFS: Rock N Rumble 2
| 
|align=center| 1
|align=center| 2:34
|Cleveland, Ohio, United States
| 
|-
| Loss
|align=center| 0–1
| Daniel Akinyemi
| Decision (unanimous)
| Iron Ring
| 
|align=center| 3
|align=center| 5:00
|New Orleans, Louisiana, United States
| 
|-

References

External links
 

1984 births
Living people
American male mixed martial artists
Middleweight mixed martial artists
Mixed martial artists from Ohio
Mixed martial artists utilizing Isshin-ryū
Mixed martial artists utilizing wrestling
Mixed martial artists utilizing Brazilian jiu-jitsu
Sportspeople from Kent, Ohio
African-American mixed martial artists
American male sport wrestlers
American male karateka
American practitioners of Brazilian jiu-jitsu
People from Independence, Ohio
21st-century African-American sportspeople
20th-century African-American people